John Simpkins (June 27, 1862 – March 27, 1898) was a U.S. Representative from Massachusetts.

Born in New Bedford, Massachusetts, Simpkins attended the public schools of Yarmouth and St. Mark's School, Southboro, Massachusetts.
He graduated from Harvard University in 1885. From 1890 through 1891 he served as a member of the Massachusetts State Senate.
He served as president of the Republican Club of Massachusetts in 1892 and 1893.
He served as member of the Republican State committee 1892–1894.

Simpkins was elected as a Republican to the Fifty-fourth and Fifty-fifth Congresses and served from March 4, 1895, until his death in Washington, D.C., on March 27, 1898.
He was interred in Woodside Cemetery, Yarmouth, Massachusetts.

He amassed a large collection of books that was donated to the public school he had attended (at 134 Old Main Street in South Yarmouth, Massachusetts) upon his death in 1898. The school was named for him. The school opened in 1930 for grades 1–12. In 1958, after the new Dennis-Yarmouth Regional High School was built, it first became a middle school and then an elementary school.
In 2006 it closed.

See also

List of United States Congress members who died in office (1790–1899)

References

External links
 
 Memorial addresses on the life and character of John Simpkins By United States. 55th Congress, 2d-3d sessions, 1898-1899.

St. Mark's School (Massachusetts) alumni
Harvard University alumni
1862 births
1898 deaths
Republican Party Massachusetts state senators
Republican Party members of the United States House of Representatives from Massachusetts
19th-century American politicians